The Borneo Post, established in 1978, is the largest and widest read English-language daily newspaper in East Malaysia. In June 2018, Reuters Institute's Digital News Report 2018 ranked The Borneo Post third in terms of brand trust of users of the brand behind first placed Astro Awani and international news website Yahoo! News.

Overview 
The Borneo Post was established in 1978. In 2007, the news portal website was launched to capture a larger pool of younger readers. The newspaper has five printing plants located throughout Sarawak and Sabah. The newspaper is printed daily in Kuching, Sibu, Miri, Kota Kinabalu and Lahad Datu.

Circulation
Audited circulation figures by Audit Bureau of Circulations Malaysia for January-June 2015, the newspaper is the highest circulated English newspaper in Sarawak, with a circulation of 65,990 (daily) and 70,073 (the Sunday Post). For the same period, the Sabah edition of the newspaper reached a circulation of 22,971 copies.

Sister Publications
The Borneo Post has two sister publications; Utusan Borneo and See Hua Daily News.

Utusan Borneo 
Utusan Borneo is a Malay-Iban (for the Sabah edition, it is bilingual in Malay and Kadazan-Dusun language) newspaper published by Harian Borneo Post Sdn Bhd. Based on audited circulation figures by Audit Bureau of Circulations Malaysia for January-June 2015,daily circulation for the Utusan Borneo (Sarawak) of 36,251 copies in Sarawak. It is the highest circulated Malay newspaper in Sarawak and one of the top circulating local newspapers in Sabah.

Features 
 The Borneo Post Seeds- a section to cater issues related to youth readers.
 BAT5 - Borneo Post Adventure Team. The team travels across Sarawak and share with the readers on interesting places that they have encountered.

Awards

See also 

 List of newspapers in Malaysia

References

External links 
 

Newspapers published in Malaysia
English-language newspapers published in Asia
Publications established in 1978
1978 establishments in Malaysia
Mass media in Kuching
Asian news websites
Malaysian news websites